USS Hurst has been the name of more than one United States Navy ship, and may refer to:

 , a patrol boat in commission from 1918 to 1919
 , a destroyer escort in commission from 1943 to 1946

United States Navy ship names